Michael Power (died 1880) was an alderman and mayor of Toowoomba, Queensland.  He was mayor in 1871 and alderman from 1869–1870 and 1872–1873.

References

1880 deaths
Mayors of Toowoomba
Queensland local councillors
Year of birth missing